The 1994 NCAA Division I women's soccer tournament was the 13th annual single-elimination tournament to determine the national champion of NCAA Division I women's collegiate soccer. The semifinals and championship game were played at Merlo Field in Portland, Oregon during December 1994.

North Carolina defeated Notre Dame in the final, 5–0, to win their 12th national title. Coached by Anson Dorrance, the Tar Heels finished the season 25–1–1. Nonetheless, this was UNC's first season with a loss since 1985. This would go on to become the ninth of North Carolina's record nine consecutive national titles (1986–1994).

The most outstanding offensive player was Tisha Venturini from North Carolina, and the most outstanding defensive player was Staci Wilson, also from North Carolina. Venturini and Wilson, along with twelve other players, were named to the All-tournament team.

The tournament's leading scorers were Angela Kelly (North Carolina), with 4 goals and 3 assists, and Tiffeny Milbrett (Portland), with 5 goals and 1 assist.

Qualification

All Division I women's soccer programs were eligible to qualify for the tournament. The tournament field expanded for the second consecutive year, increasing from 16 to 24 teams.

Teams

Bracket

All-tournament team
Robin Confer, North Carolina
Cindy Daws, Notre Dame
Danielle Egan, North Carolina
Jill Gelfenbien, Connecticut
Debbie Keller, North Carolina
Angela Kelly, North Carolina
Holly Manthei, Notre Dame
Michelle McCarthy, Notre Dame
Tiffeny Milbrett, Portland
Jen Renola, Notre Dame
Keri Sanchez, North Carolina
Kate Sobrero, Notre Dame
Tisha Venturini, North Carolina (most outstanding offensive player)
Staci Wilson, North Carolina (most outstanding defensive player)

See also 
 NCAA Division II Women's Soccer Championship
 NCAA Division III Women's Soccer Championship

References

NCAA
NCAA Women's Soccer Championship
 
NCAA Division I Women's Soccer Tournament
NCAA Division I Women's Soccer Tournament
NCAA Division I Women's Soccer Tournament
NCAA Division I Women's Soccer Tournament
Women's sports in Oregon